Luis Milla may refer to:

Luis Milla (footballer, born 1966)
Luis Milla (footballer, born 1994)